Edoardo Ruffolo (born 11 December 1991) is an Italian rugby union player. His usual position is as a Flanker and he currently plays for Valorugby Emilia in Top12.

After playing for Italy Under 20 in 2011, in 2013 he also was named in the Emerging Italy squad.

References

External links
It's Rugby France Profile
Eurosport Profile

1991 births
Living people
Italian rugby union players
Valorugby Emilia players
Rugby union flankers